Šturmovci is a settlement in the Municipality of Videm in eastern Slovenia. It lies south of Lake Ptuj. The area traditionally belonged to the Styria region. It is now included in the Drava Statistical Region.

References

External links
Šturmovci on Geopedia

Populated places in the Municipality of Videm